Daniel Leonard Bernardi (born June 16, 1964) is a professor of Cinema at San Francisco State University, founder and President of El Dorado Films and Commander in the United States Navy Reserve. Bernardi earned a Bachelor of Arts in Radio-TV (1984) and a Masters of Arts in Media Arts (1988) from the University of Arizona. He went on to earn a PhD in Film and Television Studies from UCLA (1994). He completed a University of California postdoctoral research fellowship in 1997.

His main academic interests are media studies, narrative theory, critical race theory, and rumors as narrative IEDS.  His work in media, which is perhaps most well known, emphasizes whiteness as a historical formation of meanings. Borrowing from Michael Omi and Howard Winant's theory of racial formation, he argues that whiteness is a historically powerful set of meanings that serves to either implicitly or explicitly dominate the shifting and reforming meaning of race in U.S. media.

Bernardi is also a documentary filmmaker. His current body of work focuses on telling the veteran story. One of his more recent films, The American War (2018), tells the story of the Vietnam War from the perspective of the Vietcong. Another used discovered archival footage to tell the story of first World War, and is titled The War to End all Wars. Both films are distributed by Journeyman Pictures.

Career
Bernardi has taught film, television and new media at UC Riverside (1997–1998), UCLA (1999-2000), Arizona State University (1999-2011), and SFSU (2011–Present). He was awarded a Ford Foundation Dissertation Fellowship (1994), a UC President's Post-Doctoral Fellowship (1995–1997), and a Fulbright Fellowship (2009).  His deployment to Iraq prevented his acceptance of the Fulbright Fellowship.  From 1998 to 2000, he worked for the Sci-Fi Channel as a consultant, writer and producer/host of the web feature Future Now (since deleted).

Daniel Bernardi has earned a reputation of notoriety among the more avid Star Trek fans due to his writings about the role of race in the films.

Bernardi is also an officer in the United States Navy Reserves. From May 2009 to February 2010 he was recalled to Active Duty in support of Operation Iraqi Freedom for ten months. In Iraq, Bernardi served with US Special Forces as the Public Affairs Officer for Special Operations Task Force-Central, where he trained Iraqi Special Operations Forces (ISOF) and Emergency Response Brigade (ERB) Soldiers on combat camera and media operations. He also managed US media embeds, including CNN, NBC and AP, and US Army and US Navy journalists and photographers. In 2011 he returned to Active Duty for nine months and served as the Mission Public Affairs Officer for Pacific Partnership 2011, an annual humanitarian assistance initiative sponsored by the U.S. Pacific Fleet. Bernardi managed a team of military (U.S., Australian and New Zealand) and NGO (Project Hope) photographers, videographers and writers assigned to document and report on the mission.

Following his tour in Iraq and the South Pacific, Bernardi, working with a larger research team including H. L. (Bud) Goodall Jr., received a $1.6 million renewable grant from the Office of Naval Research to catalogue and study the impact rumors have on counterinsurgency operations. As an example, when multinational forces began a cattle vaccination program in 2005, a rumor spread among the Iraqis that U.S. forcers were poisoning their livestock. Though they had intended on using modern medicine to protect their food supplies, the rumor completely disarmed their efforts. In order to combat such debilitating narratives, Bernardi and his team worked to create a comprehensive database of known Islamist narratives and reveal how these narratives are used to influence populations in the Middle East and North Africa. The hope is that expeditionary forces would have access to these narratives and, through the team's analysis' on hand, work against them.

In 2012, Bernardi launched the Veteran Documentary Corps  (VDC) project. Founded by donations and grants, the VA and National Cemetery Administration including, VDC produces and exhibits short documentaries on the struggles and successes of veterans from across the world.  To date, VDC has produced and distributed fifty short documentaries on veterans dealing with posttraumatic stress disorder (PTSD), the fall-out of the former "don't ask, don't tell" policy, and a range of other topics.  The films are made by professional filmmakers.  Bernardi acts as executive producer.  He has also directed two of the films, one on Tim Koches (Vietnam War) and one on Michael Blackwell (Iraq War).  Blackwell was a Combat Camera photographer that served with Bernardi in the U.S. Iraq War. Bernardi directed many of the films, including Sissle's Syncopated Regime (2019).  Many of the films in the series are directed by professional filmmakers, including Jesse Moss, Andrés Gallegos, Sylvia Turchin, Eliciana Nascimento, among others.

The Veteran Documentary Corps was met with wide acclaim, and was received positively from veterans and the public alike. Created in 2018 by Bernardi, El Dorado Films brought superior talent and organization to the Veteran Documentary Corps' mission of creating 100 'shorts' by 2020.

Bibliography

As author
 Off the Page:  Screenwriting in the Era of Media Convergence (co-author).  2017.  University of California Press.

Examines the business and craft of screenwriting in the era of media convergence. Daniel Bernardi and Julian Hoxter use the recent history of screenwriting labor coupled with close analysis of scripts in the context of the screenwriting paraindustry—from “how to write a winning script” books to screenwriting software—to explore the state of screenwriting today. They address the conglomerate studios making tentpole movies, expanded television, Indiewood, independent animation, microbudget scripting, the video games industry, and online content creation. Designed for students, producers, and writers who want to understand what studios want and why they want it, this book also examines how scripting is developing in the convergent media, beneath and beyond the Hollywood tentpole. By addressing specific genres across a wide range of media, this essential volume sets the standard for anyone in the expanded screenwriting industry and the scholars that study it.

 Narrative Landmines: Rumors, Islamist Extremism, and the Struggle for Strategic Influence Rumors (co-authored).  2012. Rutgers University Press.

Bernardi and his co-authors characterize rumors as bits and pieces of prevailing narrative systems and local cultural artifacts, and that their anonymous origin and dubious truth claims afford them a type of concealment until their effects are known and the damage is done.  Focusing on the impact of rumors on counterinsurgency operations (Iraq), counter terrorism whisper campaigns (Indonesia), and civil disobedience online (Singapore), they argue that rumors are narrative IEDs, or Improvised Explosive Device, in that they're constructed of locally available materials and hidden in the landscape until detonation.  Bernardi and his co-authors see rumors as similarly ad hoc, constructed of bits and pieces of narrative systems, and lying unseen to the military information operator, diplomat, civic outreach coordinator, or business strategist until exploding and disrupting expensive and highly wrought communication campaigns.

Star Trek and History:  Race-ing Toward a White Future". 1998. Rutgers University Press. 

Bernardi traces the shifting and reforming meaning of race articulated throughout the Star Trek television series, feature films, and fan community, investigating and, in his word, "politicizing" the presentation of race in Star Trek in the original series of the 1960s, the feature films and television spin-offs of the 1980s and 1990s, and the current fan community on the Internet. Through both critical and historical analysis, he proposes a method of studying the framing of race in popular film and television that integrates sociology, critical theory and cultural studies. Bernardi goes on to examine the representational and narrative functions of race in Star Trek and explores how the meaning of "race" in the science fiction series has been facilitated or constrained by creative and network decision-making, by genre, by intertextuality, and by fans. He interprets how the changing social and political movements of the times have influenced the production and meaning of "Trek" texts and the ways in which the ongoing series negotiated and reflected these turbulent histories.  Unpopular with many Trekkers, Star Trek and History went into a second printing after a year of its original publication.  Other readers feel Bernardi apologies for Star Trek's racial vision.

As editor
 Race in American Film: Voices and Visions That Shaped a Nation, Volumes I, II and III. (co-editor). 2017. Greenwood Publishers. 
Hollywood's Chosen People: The Jewish Experience in American Cinema(co-edited). 2012. Wayne State University Press.  
Filming Difference: Actors, Directors, Producers and Writers on Gender, Race and Sexuality in Film. 2009.  University of Texas Press.  
The Persistence of Whiteness.  2007.  Routledge.  
Classic Hollywood/Classic Whiteness.  2001.  University of Minnesota Press.  The Birth of Whiteness:  Race and the Emergence of U.S. Cinema.  1996.  Rutgers University Press.  

In these books, Bernardi relies on a range of scholars to show how race in general and whiteness in particular formed unique representational, narrational, and institutional patterns across U.S. film history.  The introductions to each book set out a broad theory of whiteness in American film that, in brief, positions whiteness as a performance about who passes and who doesn't pass as white — and what it means in specific films and periods of film history to either pass or not pass as white.  The last book in the series, Filming Difference, includes essays and interviews by filmmakers who address critically and creatively how they go about representing race, gender and sexuality in their work.  .

As filmmaker
 VALOR Film Series: Stories that honor our country's heroes and their accomplishments.
Legacy Films (Made in partnership with the National Cemetery Administration): A series of short films on veterans buried in San Francisco and Golden Gate National Cemeteries– from stories of service in Civil War to Buffalo Soldier, from WWI to Vietnam to Iraq. 
 Noble Sissle's Syncopated Ragtime: In this Academy Awards eligible documentary, Noble Sissle's incredible life spans "The Harlem Hellfighters" of World War I, Broadway Theatre, the civil rights movement, and decades of Black cultural production in this short documentary.
 Guy Hircefeld, A Guy with a Camera: In this Academy Awards eligible documentary, Guy Hircefeld, a veteran that served in the Israeli military at the start of its occupation of Palestine in the 1980s, now fights against Israeli occupation, ethnic cleansing, and environmental warfare. His only weapon is a camera.
 Nurse Helen Fairchild: Bravery, Compassion and the will to save lives motivated the young Nurse Helen Fairchild to leave home in Pennsylvania and embark on a journey to Europe, where she served as a surgical nurse during the World War I.
 Frank Maselskis: from WWII POW to Chosin Reservoir Survivor: A prisoner of war in World War II, Frank Maselskis decides to join the Korean War, where he participates in the battle of Chosin, a brutal combat that took place in the most extreme weather conditions.
 Alene B. Duerk: The First Woman Admiral: Alene B. Duerk: The First Woman Admiral is a short documentary that tells the story of how Alene Duerk overcame gender stereotypes in the military to accomplish the highest rank ever achieved by a woman in the history of the US Navy.

As producer
 Women in Science: Iliana Nossa (The Ionosphere) & Anne Virkki (Near Earth Asteroids), two female scientists at Arecibo Observatory, Puerto Rico.
 Cemetery Profiles and Field Notes: In this series, we hope to tell the story of our National Cemeteries. Veteran Documentary Corps shot these films in late April 2019 as part of our partnership with the National Cemetery Administration. All films are available on our social media platforms.
 Madame Mars is a short film about women in space. As a new space age dawns, have women come far enough to go farther than they ever have before? Women have faced challenges while trying to study and explore Mars– from early space age pioneers to those currently working.
 Objector directed by Molly Stuart tells the story of Atalya Ben Abba. Like all Israeli teenagers, Atalya Ben Abba is obligated to become a soldier. Unlike most, she questions the ethics of her country's military and becomes determined to challenge this rite of passage. Objector follows Atalya through her conscientious objection, imprisonment, and beyond, as she attempts to reconcile her Jewish identity, her love for her family and her homeland, and her dedication to Palestinian rights

Selected publications
Bernardi, Daniel. The Birth of Whiteness:  Race and the Emergence of U.S. Cinema.  1996.  Rutgers University Press.  
Bernardi, Daniel. Star Trek and History:  Race-ing Toward a White Future.  1998. Rutgers University Press. 
Bernardi, Daniel.  "Where's the Beef?" Flow On-line, Volume 2.  April 1, 2005.
"Narrative Landmines: The Explosive Effects of Rumors in Syria and Insurgencies Around the World".  Small Wars Journal.  March 21, 2013.
 Word:ChristChurch, Autumn Season 2017. "James Gleick: Time Travel Feat. James Gleick, Dr Daniel Bernardi (interviewer)".  Audiomack.  July 19, 2017.
"Prof. Daniel Bernardi on Star Trek and Race." (interview with Bernardi) Trekdom - Star Trek Fanzine''. June 25, 2007.
"Lt. Cmdr. Daniel Bernardi."  In Depth Show.  Federal News Radio.  January 10, 2014. Radio.

References

Film theorists
American mass media scholars
United States Navy personnel of the Iraq War
Living people
1964 births
People from San Juan, Puerto Rico
Puerto Rican United States Navy personnel
Arizona State University faculty
UCLA Film School alumni
University of Arizona alumni
United States Navy officers
United States Navy reservists